La Révolution Française is a French rock opera by Claude-Michel Schönberg and Raymond Jeannot, book by Alain Boublil and Jean-Max Rivière, created in  1973. The show premiered at the Palais des Sports de Paris.

Synopsis
With the French Revolution as its background, we see unfold the fictional story of the impossible love between Charles Gauthier and Isabelle de Montmorency. Gauthier is the son of a shopkeeper who becomes a member of the Tiers-État, while Isabelle is an aristocrat who is forced to flee with the royal family.

Creative team
Book and Lyrics: Alain Boublil and Jean-Max Rivière
Music: Claude-Michel Schönberg and Raymond Jeannot
Arrangements: Jean-Claude Petit and Martin Circus

Original cast
Antoine : Général Bonaparte
Cyril Azzam: General Kellermann
Alain Bashung: Robespierre
Jean Bentho: M. de La Fayette, Counsellor to the King
Les Enfants de Bondy : The Children of the King (Louis and Marie-Thérèse)
Françoise Boublil: Charlotte Corday
Gérard Rinaldi: Talleyrand
Les Charlots: Priests
Noëlle Cordier : Isabelle de Montmorency
Mario d'Alba: King's Counsellor/Newspaper Seller/Prison Guard
Franca di Rienzo : Marie-Antoinette
Raymond Jeannot: Newspaper Seller
Gérard Layani : La Terreur (Soloist)
Gérard Blanc: Danton
Martin Circus: Members of the Tiers-État
Jean-François Michael : Les Chouans (Soloist)
Jean-Max Rivière: Marat
Jean-Pierre Savelli: Charles Gauthier
Claude-Michel Schönberg: Louis XVI
Jean Schultheis: Antoine Fouquier-Tinville
Élisabeth Vigna: Madame Sans-Gêne
Système Crapoutchick: La Noblesse, La Terreur

Discography
There are two versions of this work available: the original double album as well as the triple, expanded album of the presentation at the Theatre Mogador.

First version
The disk has been released in a double-vinyl album from Vogue in 1973. This release contained a 16-page booklet, 12 pages of which featured cartoons incorporating the words of the songs. The disk has been re-edited several times since, in 1989, for example, to celebrate the bicentennial of the French Revolution.

Songlist
Ouverture - Choir
Les États généraux (5 mai 1789) :
Le Roi - Louis XVI (The King)
La Noblesse - Choir  (The Nobility)
Le Clergé - Choir (Clergy)
Le Tiers-État - The Members of the Tiers-État
Charles Gauthier (mai 1789) - Charles Gauthier
À Versailles (14 juillet 1789) - The King's children and Louis XVI ("At Versaille", 14 July 1789)
Retour de la Bastille : Français, Français - Robespierre and Choir ("The Return of the Bastille; Frenchmen, Frenchmen")
Il s'appelle Charles Gauthier - Isabelle de Montmorency ("He is Called Charles Gauthier")
À bas tous les privilèges (nuit du 4 août 1789) - Choir ("Down With all Privileges", night of 4 August 1789)
Déclaration des droits de l'homme et du citoyen (26 août 1789) - Charles Gauthier ("Declaration of the Rights of Man and of the Citizen", 26 August 1789)
Ça ira, ça ira ! (5-6 octobre 1789) - Louis XVI, La Fayette, a counsellor and Choir ("It'll Be Fine, It'll Be Fine!", 5–6 October 1789)
Quatre saisons pour un amour - Isabelle de Montmorency ("Four Seasons for a Love")
Serment de Talleyrand (12 juillet 1789) / Fête de la Fédération (14 juillet 1790) - Talleyrand and Choir ("Oath of Talleyrand", 12 July 1789) / "Festival of the Federation", 14 July 1790)
Crieurs de journaux (21 juin 1791) / La patrie est en danger (11 juillet 1792) - Danton and Choir ("Newspaper Sellers", 21 June 1791 / "The Fatherland is in Danger", 11 July 1792)
L'Exil (10 août 1792) - Charles Gauthier and Isabelle de Montmorency ("Exile", 10 August 1792)
Valmy (20 septembre 1792) / Proclamation de la République (21 septembre 1792) - General Kellermann and Choir ("Valmy", 20 September 1792 / "Proclamation of the Republic", 21 September 1792)
C'est du beau linge, mon général - Madame Sans-Gêne, General Bonaparte and Choir ("They're Beautiful Clothes, My General")
Le Procès de Louis XVI : Réquisitoire (10 décembre 1792) - Fouquier-Tinville ("The Trial of Louis XVI: Indictment", 10 December 1792)
Louis XVI / Exécution (21 janvier 1793) - Louis XVI and Choir ("Louis XVI" / "Execution", 21 January 1793)
Chouans, en avant ! (juin 1793) - Les Chouans ("Chouans, Forward!", June 1793)
La terreur est en nous - Choir ("Terror is in Us")
L'Horrible Assassinat du citoyen Marat par la perfide Charlotte Corday (13 juillet 1793) - Marat and Charlotte Corday ("The Horrible Assassination of Citizen Marat by the Perfidious Charlotte Corday", 13 July 1793)
Fouquier-Tinville
Au petit matin (25 vendémiaire an II / 16 octobre 1793) - Marie-Antoinette ("Early Morning", 25 Vendémiaire Year II / 16 October 1793)
Que j'aie tort ou que j'aie raison (16 germinal an II / 5 avril 1794) - Robespierre and Choir ("Whether I'm Wrong or Right", 16 Germinal Year II / 5 April 1794)
La Fête de l'Être suprême (20 prairial an II / 8 juin 1794)- Robespierre and Choir ("The Festival of the Supreme Being", 20 Prairial Year II / 8 June 1794)
La Prison - The Prison Guard and IsabelleRévolution'' (final) - Charles and Isabelle

The songs were distributed on the original double album as follows:
1-5 : Disc 1, side 1
6-10 : Disc 2, side 1 (2)
11-16 : Disc 2, side 2 (3)
17-25 : Disc 1, side 2 (4)

1977 version 
 The passage concerned with Charlotte Corday's assassination of Jean-Paul Marat was totally rewritten. While only a small intermezzo in the first version, it becomes an opera trio between Charlotte, Marat (who sings with a dagger in his heart) and his servant.
 One new scene was added : a confrontational dialogue between Charles Gauthier and Robespierre, each verse of which is a retort of the other character.

Recordings 
1973 : Double album (LDM 30166 or LD 30166 / VG 308 430166 without booklet)
1977 : 3 disc box set (VG603 or C.V.U. 316)
1987 : First reissue on CD of 24 titres originaux (VG 651-600 146)	
1989 : Special reissue for bicentennial of the French Revolution (PM 524 310 296 without booklet)
2000 : Reissue in standard and luxury editions (Anthology's B00004ZBMN)

External links 
 La Révolution française, unofficial site
 La Révolution française, MySpace

References 

Musicals by Claude-Michel Schönberg
Rock operas
1973 musicals
French musicals
French Revolution in fiction